Megat Junid bin Megat Ayub (8 December 1942 – 24 January 2008) was a Malaysian politician and direct descendant of Megat Terawis, a Bendahara of Perak.

Biography
Junid was born in Teluk Intan in 1942.

Politics
Megat Junid was a teacher by profession and first met Malaysian Prime Minister Mahathir Mohamad in the early 1970s. Mahathir was living in exile for criticising then Prime Minister Tunku Abdul Rahman at the time of their meeting. Junid soon left teaching to become Mahathir's special assistant.

Junid was first elected as a Malaysian Member of Parliament at the same time that Mahathir became Prime Minister of the country. He was appointed Deputy Minister of Primary Industries in Mahathir's government, just two years later.

In 1986, Mahathir next appointed Junid to be his deputy in the Ministry of Home Affairs. Junid's tenure as the Deputy Minister of Home Affairs was rocked by several controversies, including illegal immigration, a spike in illicit drug use and Operation Lalang of 1987.

Junid was appointed to become Malaysia's Minister of Domestic Trade and Consumer Affairs in 1997. He served in the post for two years until he lost his seat in Parliament to a PAS candidate in the 1999 "Reformasi" elections.

Death
Megat Junid died on 24 January 2008, aged 65, at the Pantai Medical Centre in Bangsar following a battle with prostate cancer. His body was buried at Bukit Kiara Muslim Cemetery in Kuala Lumpur,  Malaysia. He was a resident of Kelana Jaya.

Election results

Honours

Honours of Malaysia
  :
  Commander of the Order of Loyalty to the Crown of Malaysia (PSM) – Tan Sri (2000)
  :
  Member of the Order of the Perak State Crown (AMP) (1979)
  Knight of the Order of Cura Si Manja Kini (DPCM) – Dato' (1986)
  Knight Grand Commander of the Order of the Perak State Crown (SPMP) – Dato' Seri (1998)
  :
  Knight Companion of the Order of Sultan Ahmad Shah of Pahang (DSAP) – Dato' (1988)
  :
  Knight Companion of the Order of Sultan Salahuddin Abdul Aziz Shah (DSSA) – Dato' (1992)
  :
  Grand Commander of the Order of Kinabalu (SPDK) – Datuk Seri Panglima (1996)
  :
  Knight Commander of the Order of the Crown of Kelantan (DPMK) – Dato' (1997)

References

External links
 The Star: Megat Junid dies

 

1942 births
2008 deaths
People from Perak
Deaths from prostate cancer
Deaths from cancer in Malaysia
United Malays National Organisation politicians
Malaysian Muslims
Malaysian people of Malay descent
University of Malaya alumni
Government ministers of Malaysia
Members of the Dewan Rakyat
Grand Commanders of the Order of Kinabalu
Commanders of the Order of Loyalty to the Crown of Malaysia